Splats is a fanzine with comics.  It is sold mainly within Patras as well as other cities. The volume does not number ant its stories are entirely humoristic. It has sold several volumes.

See also
List of newspapers in Greece

References
The first version of the article is translated and is based from the article at the Greek Wikipedia (el:Main Page)

Fanzines
Mass media in Patras